Bukorovac is a village in Pivara municipality in Kragujevac city district in the Šumadija District of central Serbia. It is located east of the city.

References

External links
Satellite map at Maplandia.com

Populated places in Šumadija District
Kragujevac